William Oakley (31 August 1857 – 22 November 1918) was a gunner's mate second class serving in the United States Navy during the Spanish–American War who received the Medal of Honor for bravery.

Biography
Oakley was born on 31 August 1857 at 5 Hanover Street, Aberdeen, Scotland, and emigrated to the United States in April 1880. He enlisted in the Navy at Boston in November 1880 and was sent to fight in the Spanish–American War aboard the U.S.S. Marblehead as a gunner's mate second class. He was later promoted to gunner's mate first class.

He returned to England after 1911 as a US Navy pensioner and died 22 November 1918 in Wivenhoe, Essex, England. He was buried in the Old Cemetery (grave reference: section B-2-65).

In 2018 the US government erected a headstone at his grave which had previously been unmarked.

Medal of Honor citation

See also

List of Medal of Honor recipients for the Spanish–American War
List of foreign-born Medal of Honor recipients

References

1857 births
1918 deaths
American military personnel of the Spanish–American War
English-born Medal of Honor recipients
English emigrants to the United States
People from Colchester
People from New York (state)
Spanish–American War recipients of the Medal of Honor
United States Navy Medal of Honor recipients
United States Navy sailors
Burials in Essex
Military personnel from Aberdeen